The Charles R. Craig Building is a historic commercial building at 113 South Main Street in downtown Bentonville, Arkansas.  It is a brick two story building, clad in stucco and a distinctive pressed metal facade with Italianate styling.  It was built c. 1900 by Charles Craig, a real estate broker and merchant.  The building was later occupied by J. W. Blocker, who owned the Bentonville Apple Evaporator.  It is believed that he installed the large walk-in safe on the premises.  It continues to be used for housing professional offices.

The building was listed on the National Register of Historic Places in 2003.

See also
National Register of Historic Places listings in Benton County, Arkansas

References

Office buildings on the National Register of Historic Places in Arkansas
Italianate architecture in Arkansas
Buildings designated early commercial in the National Register of Historic Places in Arkansas
Commercial buildings completed in 1910
National Register of Historic Places in Bentonville, Arkansas
1910 establishments in Arkansas